A dive start is the action begun at the start of a swimming race. In most strokes, the swimmer jumps off the diving blocks after hearing the starting signal. However, if it is a backstroke event, the swimmers will be starting in the water. All dives are followed by a streamline just like turning.

External links
Female swimmers on the diving blocks getting ready to dive
Male swimmers in the middle of a dive
Male swimmers in the middle of a Backstroke start

Swimming